Stige is a large village and northern suburb of  Odense, in Funen, Denmark.  It lies on the northern side of the Odense Canal from Odense and is primarily residential.

References

Suburbs of Odense
Populated places in Funen